The Guddu Thermal Power Plant, also known by other names such as Central Power Generation Company Limited, and GENCO-II, is a thermal power station located in Guddu, Sindh, Pakistan. Built in 1980s, the power plant was built with joint technical cooperation and financial assistance from the Union of Soviet Socialist Republics (USSR).

In April 2014, the then-Prime Minister Nawaz Sharif inaugurated commissioning of two gas turbines of 243 MW each.

, the station had seventeen installed power units and its contribution to the national grid stood between 1,400 MW to 1,750 MW.

See also

 List of power stations in Pakistan
 Guddu, Pakistan
 Guddu Barrage

References

Pakistan–Soviet Union relations
Soviet foreign aid
Natural gas-fired power stations in Pakistan
Water and Power Development Authority
Generation companies